CareerBuilder is an employment website founded in 1995  with offices in the United States, Canada, Europe, and Asia. In 2008, it had the largest market share among online employment websites in the United States, where it was founded. CareerBuilder.com provides labor market information, talent management software, and other recruitment related services. The company is owned by investment firm Apollo Global Management.

International scope
CareerBuilder operates sites in 23 countries outside the U.S., and has a presence in over 60 markets. In 2011, CareerBuilder acquired JobsCentral in Singapore and JobScout24 in Germany. In 2014, CareerBuilder acquired recruiting technology company Broadbean in the U.K.

CareerBuilder also owns and operates several websites under the CareerBuilder name in various countries including CareerBuilder.ca in Canada, CareerBuilder.fr in France, Jobs.de in Germany, CareerBuilder.co.in in India, CareerBuilder.se in Sweden and CareerBuilder.co.uk in the United Kingdom. The company has a number of subsidiaries such as Kariera.gr in Greece, Cao-emplois.com, Erecrut.com, Ingenieur-emplois.com, LesJeudis.com, PhonEmploi.com and Recrulex.com in France, economicmodeling.com, oilandgasjobsearch.com, Jobmedic.co.uk and Toplanguagejobs.com in the United Kingdom and Textkernel in the Netherlands. It also operates niche job search sites including Sologig.com, Headhunter.com, CareerRookie.com, MiracleWorkers.com, WorkinRetail.com and JobsInMotion.com.

Company information
CareerBuilder is majority-owned by Apollo Global Management. It was previously jointly owned by Tegna Digital, The McClatchy Company and Tribune Media.

CareerBuilder is headquartered in Chicago, Illinois, with IT headquarters in Peachtree Corners, Georgia and their international headquarters in London, England. In 2012, the company had about 3,000 employees globally.

History
CareerBuilder was founded by Robert J. McGovern in 1995 as NetStart Inc. selling software to companies for listing job openings on their Web sites and the ability to manage the incoming e-mails those listings created.

In 1996, Netstart raised $2 million in investment.

In 1998, NetStart Inc. changed its name to CareerBuilder and raised another $7 million in investment.

In 1999, the company's IPO raised $8 million more than initially forecast, but was less successful than other Net offerings of the time. In its first day of trading, the stock opened at $17.50 and rose as high as $20 before closing at $16. Microsoft acquired a minority stake in the company in exchange for using the company's database on their own web portal.

In July 2000, the company was purchased in a joint venture by Knight Ridder and Tribune Company for $8 a share CareerBuilder acquired competitors CareerPath.com and later Headhunter.net which had already acquired CareerMosaic. At that time and after the acquisitions, CareerBuilder still trailed behind the number one employment site Monster.com and number two Hotjobs.com.

In 2001, major newspapers owned by Knight Ridder and the Tribune Company merged their help wanted sections with the online component.

Robert McGovern was replaced as CEO in March 2002 by Robert Montgomery. Gannett purchased a one-third interest in the company for $98.3 million in 2002, adding the CareerBuilder brand to its 90 newspapers nationwide. The company suffered major difficulty because of the dot com crash and nearly went bankrupt.

The McClatchy Company purchased Knight Ridder for $4.5 billion in stock and cash in March 2006.

In December 2008, the company announced layoffs affecting approximately 300 employees.

In September 2012, the company acquired Economic Modeling Specialists Intl. (EMSI), an economic modeling software firm based in Moscow, Idaho. EMSI was sold to Strada Education Network in April 2018.

In 2016, CareerBuilder and Capella University launched the RightSkill program. The company also expanded into background screening with the acquisition of Aurico and post-hire software with the acquisition of WORKTERRA.

In June 2017, CareerBuilder was purchased by the private-equity firm Apollo Global Management and the Ontario Teachers’ Pension Plan Board. In September of that year, CareerBuilder laid off 120 employees. Irina Novoselsky was appointed as CEO in October 2017, and in July 2021, was replaced as CEO by Sue Arthur from Optum.

Awards
In April 2006 CareerBuilder.com's site was nominated for a Webby Award in the employment category.
In May 2019, CareerBuilder received a Bronze Stevie Award for the AI Resume Builder.

Consumer complaints 
According to two consumer complaints received by the office of Illinois Attorney General, Lisa Madigan, and reports from other states, scam artists have been contacting job hunters through CareerBuilder.com regarding a "Donations Handler" position with an international charity. The agreement is a classic pigeon drop. The "handler" accepts checks sent in the mail from Peachtree Corners, Georgia and is required to wire transfer the amount to an international account within 24 hours. The checks are later discovered to be fraudulent. Victims reported losing between $500 and $2,000 in this scheme.

See also 
 Employment website
 Apollo Global Management

References

External links
 

Employment websites in the United States
Apollo Global Management companies
Business services companies established in 1995
Internet properties established in 1995
Companies based in Chicago
1995 establishments in the United States
Professional networks